James Andrew Brogan (5 June 1944 – 24 September 2018) was a Scottish footballer who played in over 200 league games for Jock Stein's highly successful Celtic sides of the late 1960s and early 1970s. He joined Celtic from local side St Roch's.

Brogan played in the 1970 European Cup Final and won four caps for Scotland. He won Scottish League Championships in seven consecutive seasons from 1967–68 to 1973–74, four Scottish Cups in 1968–69, 1970–71, 1971–72 and 1973–74, and three Scottish League Cups in 1968–69, 1969–70 and 1974–75.

His older brother Frank also began his career at Celtic, though is better known as a player for Ipswich. The siblings played in two matches alongside one another for Celtic.

In 2017, Brogan's family confirmed that he had been suffering from dementia for several years, which they believed was connected to his football career. Brogan died on 24 September 2018, aged 74. His ashes are interred in Magheragallon Cemetery, Gweedore, County Donegal, Ireland.

References

External links
 
 

1944 births
2018 deaths
Footballers from Glasgow
Scottish footballers
Association football fullbacks
Scotland international footballers
Celtic F.C. players
Coventry City F.C. players
Ayr United F.C. players
Scottish Football League players
English Football League players
Scottish Football League representative players
St Roch's F.C. players
Deaths from dementia in Scotland
Scottish Junior Football Association players
People educated at St Joseph's College, Dumfries